Mr. Swing is an album by trumpeter Harry Edison which was recorded in 1958 at the same session that produced The Swinger and released on the Verve label in 1960.

Track listing 
All compositions by Harry Edison except where noted.
 "Love Is Here to Stay" (George Gershwin, Ira Gershwin) – 9:52 	
 "Short Coat" – 9:46 	
 "Baby, Won't You Please Come Home" (Charles Warfield, Clarence Williams) – 5:10 	
 "Impresario"  – 8:42 	
 "Ill Wind" (Harold Arlen, Ted Koehler) – 5:53

Personnel 
Harry Edison – trumpet
Jimmy Forrest – tenor saxophone
Jimmy Jones – piano
Freddie Green – guitar
Joe Benjamin – bass
Charlie Persip – drums

References 

1960 albums
Harry Edison albums
Verve Records albums
Albums produced by Norman Granz